Flow Music is a Puerto Rican record label founded by DJ Nelson specializing in the reggaeton genre.

Associated Labels

On Top Of The World Music
The Producer Inc
Bokisucio Music
Flow La Movie

Artists

J Alvarez
Wambo

Producers

DJ Nelson
Alejandro Armes
Onell Flow
Perreke
Klasico

Former Artists

Andy Boy
Ñejo & Dalmata
Las Guanabanas
Joan & O'Neill
Gringo
Dandy & Aldo
Wibal & Alex
K-Mil
Lui-G 21+
J Alvarez
Chris G "El Soldado"
Jhony Ou
Che El Robotico
Anonimus

Former Producers
DJ Memo
Marioso "El Ingeniero Musical"
Elliot "El Mago de Oz"
Dimitri "El Boss"
DJ Jamsha
Noriega
DJ Wassie
Montana "The Producer"

Albums Released by Flow Music

 1997 Nel-Zone (DJ Nelson)
 1997 The Flow (DJ Nelson)
 1998 Back to Reality (Las Guanabanas)
 1999 Back to Reality 2 (Las Guanabanas)
 2001 Music (DJ Nelson)
 2003 Mas Flow (Luny Tunes & Noriega)
 2004 Flow la Discoteka (DJ Nelson)
 2004 Collection Two (Las Guanabanas)
 2004 La Trayectoria (Luny Tunes)
 2004 Contra la Corriente (Noriega)
 2005 The Flow: Sweet Dreams (Special Edition) (DJ Nelson)
 2007 Flow la Discoteka 2 (DJ Nelson)
 2007 El Independiente (Gringo) (Baby Rasta & Gringo)
 2007 Broke & Famous (Ñejo & Dalmata)
 2008 Broke & Famous: Still Broke the Mixtape (Ñejo & Dalmata)
 2009 El Dueño Del Sistema (J Alvarez)
 2009 El Dueño Del Sistema (Special Edition) (J Alvarez)
 2010 El Movimiento (The Mixtape) (J Alvarez)
 2010 El BokiSucio (The Mixtape) (Lui-G 21+)
 2011 El Soldado (The Mixtape) (Chris G)
 2011 Otro Nivel De Musica (J Alvarez)
 2012 Otro Nivel De Música Reloaded (J Alvarez)
 2012 El Patán (Lui-G 21+)
 2012 El Soldado The Álbum (Chris G)
 2012 Los Bionikos World Edition (Wibal & Alex)
 2013 Step By Step (The Mixtape) (Yoseph The One)
 2013 La Buya: Flow Music Hits (DJ Nelson)
 2013 El Anonimato (Anonimus)
 2014 De Camino Pa La Cima (J Alvarez)
 2014 Perreke Presenta: La Makinaria Vol.1 (Perreke & Onell Flow)
 2014 Perreke Presenta: La Makinaria Vol.2 (Perreke & Onell Flow)
 2015 De Camino Pa' La Cima Reloaded (J Alvarez)

Albums Coming Soon

 2015 Los Que Gustan (Klasico)
 2016 Flow La Discoteka 3 (Dj Nelson & Onellflow)

References

Labels distributed by Universal Music Group